Claude Roussel  (born 1930) is a Canadian sculptor, painter and educator.

Early life and education 
Roussel was born in 1930 in Edmundston, New Brunswick, Canada. He was 10 years old when he began sculpting wood. At the age of 14, Roussel's artistic possibilities was discovered by Dr. Paul Carmen Laporte (1885-1973, surgeon, artist and mentor) when Roussel shows him a plaque entitled Trout (1944), an artwork created using only a file and his own intuitive knowledge. With Laporte's mentorship, Roussel advanced his wood carving techniques, and showed his early works at his first solo exhibition in 1947, at the age of 17, the year he completed his Lycée studies in Edmundston.

From 1950 to 1956, he studied under the tutelage of art professors at the École des beaux-arts de Montréal in Quebec, Canada, where he graduated with a diploma in drawing professorship in 1955, and a diploma in sculpture in 1956. During his studies, Quebec's artistic revolutions of Le Refus Global, 1948, and Les Automatistes, 1941-1960 played an influence on Roussel, who not only admired but practised within his own work their expressive forms of art, and implemented the use of bold colours and abstract forms. In 1961, Roussel was awarded a Senior Fellowship from the Canada Council for the Arts to study Europe's important art, especially architectural decorations in England, France, Italy and Spain.

Career 
After completing his studies, Roussel returned to his hometown where he became the first professional artist to teach Education Through Art in the public school system of the province of New Brunswick. From 1959 to 1961, Roussel was employed at the Beaverbrook Art Gallery in Fredericton as the first francophone occupying a curatorial position. During the public announcement of his appointment, Lord Beaverbrook stated "I think young Roussel will give the gallery a major liaison with the Acadian culture of this area and at the same time impart to our French Canadian artists a real sense of belonging".

In 1963, at the invitation of Father Clément Cormier, vice chancellor and founder of University de Moncton, New Brunswick, and with a special grant from Canada Council for the Arts, Roussel became the first Artist-in-residence given the responsibility to develop the visual arts curriculum. He is the founding director of the university's Visual Arts Department who occupied the position from 1963 to 1971, and again from 1976 to 1979. He is also the founding director of the university's Art Gallery, from 1964 to 1967, during which he organized in 1964 an exhibition of Canadian masters - Borduas, Pellan, Riopelle et Dumouchel - and the first two major exhibitions of works by Acadian artists, Selection 65 and Selection 67. He retired from his position as professor in 1992 after a tenure of 29 years.

Roussel was a member of the Maritime Education Foundation and the Jack Chambers Memorial Foundation. He was chair of Louise-et-Reuben-Cohen acquisition fund for the Art Gallery of the University of Moncton until 1991. From 1971-1976, he was the founding president of Canadian Artists Representation (CARFAC) representing New Brunswick.

Notable monumental artwork
Roussel has been exhibited at more than 200 solo and group shows in Canada and internationally. His artworks are found in many countries but especially in Canada's eastern provinces. Roussel has created more than 60 monumental and public art sculptures, twelve of which are listed below.

 Beavers, 1959, limestone, Officer's Square, Fredericton, New Brunswick (presented to Lord Beaverbrook by the Government of New Brunswick on the occasion of his 80th birthday)
 Fishermen's Monument, 1959-1969, limestone, Escuminac Disaster Monument Provincial Historic Site, New Brunswick
 Éros, 1971, welded Corten steel, Université de Moncton, Moncton, New Brunswick
 Progression, 1972, fiberglass, City Hall of Saint John, New Brunswick
 Atlantic, 1976, steel and epoxy, Summer Olympic Games XXI, City of Kingston, Ontario
 Brûlez et détruisez tout, 1986, polyester paste, Grand-Pré National Historic Site, Nova Scotia
 Dina Bolts, 1988, XXIV Summer Olympic Sculpture Garden, Seoul, South Korea
 Monument Père Clément-Cormier, 1990, bronze casting, Université de Moncton, Moncton, New Brunswick
 Moncton 100 Monument, 1990, bronze, steel and granite, Moncton, New Brunswick
 Transition 2000, 1999, welded brass and copper, UNI Coopération financière, Moncton, New Brunswick
 Monument Mère Marie Léonie, 2004, bronze casting, Memramcook, New Brunswick
 Inspire-Action, 2017, welded steel, City of Dieppe, New Brunswick

Gallery

Awards and honours 
1964: Allied Arts Medal of the Royal Architectural Institute of Canada
1967: Centennial Medal
1972: Knight of the Order of the Pléiade
1976: Symposium olympique
1977: Commemorative Medal of the Queen
1982: Medal of the Order of the Pléiade
1984: Order of Canada
1989: First Prize of the Marion McCain exhibit, Beaverbrook Art Gallery, Fredericton
1992: Medal for the 125th anniversary of Canada
2002: Order of New Brunswick
2005: Lieutenant Governor's prize for lifetime achievement

References

Further reading
   Herménégilde Chiasson, Patrick Condon Laurette, Claude Roussel: sculptor, Moncton, NB: Éditions d'Acadie, 1985, 1987. 
   Official Website of Claude Roussel

1930 births
Living people
Artists from New Brunswick
Canadian sculptors
Members of the Order of Canada
Members of the Order of New Brunswick
People from Edmundston
People from Moncton
École des beaux-arts de Montréal alumni